The Chicago and North Western Depot in Waukesha, Wisconsin is a railroad depot built in 1881 and operated by the Chicago and North Western Railway. It is a 1.5-story cream brick building and was originally built for a predecessor of the C&NW. Passenger train service to the Waukesha station ended on June 16, 1957, when trains No. 601 and 620 were discontinued between Milwaukee and Madison. The final train carried just 7 passengers.

The depot now operates as a Mexican restaurant, La Estacion. Behind the building are five passenger cars, believed to have belonged to the Gulf, Mobile and Ohio Railroad. These serve as extra dining space. Two boxcars and a caboose sit in the front of the depot, however their origins remain unknown. The depot is located next to a Wisconsin and Southern Railroad mainline, with a junction connecting it and the Canadian National Railway's Waukesha Subdivision just to the east. The C&NW track west of WI 164 has since been removed.

The depot was listed on the National Register of Historic Places in 1995 and on the State Register of Historic Places in 1994.

References

External links 
 La Estacion

Railway stations on the National Register of Historic Places in Wisconsin
National Register of Historic Places in Waukesha County, Wisconsin
Waukesha
Former railway stations in Wisconsin
Railway stations in the United States opened in 1881